Forever Young is a 2016 Italian comedy film written and directed  by Fausto Brizzi.

Plot 
Nowadays nobody has a dream anymore; rather, everybody seeks one's lost youth. If you are young you are ‘in’, if you are old you are ‘out’. The film tells the stories of a group of friends, all them ‘Forever Young’. Franco is a pumped-up 70-year-old lawyer, with a passion for Marathon running. His life will change when he becomes a grandfather and discovers that his body is not as indestructible as he thought. Angela, a beautician, has an affair with 20-year-old Luca. Diego, a radio dj, has to face the competition of a younger rival. Giorgio, who is 50 and in a relationship with a very young girl, cheats on her with a woman of his age.

Cast 
   
 Fabrizio Bentivoglio as  Giorgio
 Sabrina Ferilli as  Angela
 Stefano Fresi as  Lorenzo
 Lorenza Indovina as  Stefania
 Lillo as Diego DJ
 Teo Teocoli as  Franco
 Luisa Ranieri as  Sonia
 Claudia Zanella as Marta
 Nino Frassica as The Priest
 Emanuel Caserio as Luca
 Pilar Fogliati as  Marika 
 Francesco Sole as Nick
 Massimo Morini as DJ Fuck Radio

See also 
 List of Italian films of 2016

References

External links 

2016 comedy films
Italian comedy films
Films directed by Fausto Brizzi
Films scored by Bruno Zambrini
2010s Italian-language films
2010s Italian films